Ammonifex is a Gram-negative, extremely thermophilic, strictly anaerobic and motile genus of bacteria from the family of Thermoanaerobacteraceae.

References

Further reading 
 

 

Thermoanaerobacterales
Bacteria genera
Thermophiles
Anaerobes